The Trackers is a 1971 American Western television film directed by Earl Bellamy. It stars Ernest Borgnine, Sammy Davis Jr. and Julie Adams. The film was originally a television pilot that appeared on the ABC Movie of the Week.

Plot
In the Old West, a man hires a tracker to find his kidnapped daughter.

Cast
 Sammy Davis Jr as Ezekiel Smith 
 Ernest Borgnine as Sam Paxton 
 Julie Adams as Dora Paxton
 Connie Kreski as Becky Paxton
 Norman Alden as Pete Dilworth
 Jim Davis as Sheriff Naylor
 Caleb Brooks as El Grande
 Arthur Hunnicutt as Ben Vogel
 Leo Gordon as Higgins
 David Renard as Father Gomez
 Bill Katt as Davey Paxton
 Ross Elliott as Captain
 Lee de Broux as Bartender
 Bucklind Noah Beery as Wagon Driver

Production
Filming started in New Mexico on April 22, 1971.

Reception
The Los Angeles Times called it "trash... flabby and unimaginative."

References

External links
 The Trackers at BFI
 

1971 television films
ABC Movie of the Week
American Western (genre) television films
Films about child abduction in the United States
Films directed by Earl Bellamy
1970s English-language films